Fine Young Cannibals (FYC) was a British pop rock band formed in Birmingham, England, in 1984 by bassist David Steele, guitarist Andy Cox (both formerly of The Beat), and singer Roland Gift (formerly of the Akrylykz). Their self-titled 1985 debut album contained "Johnny Come Home" and a cover of "Suspicious Minds", two songs that were top 40 hits in the UK, Canada, Australia, and many European countries. Their 1989 album, The Raw & the Cooked, topped the UK, US, Australian, and Canadian album charts, and contained their two Billboard Hot 100 number ones: "She Drives Me Crazy" and "Good Thing".

In 1990, the band won two Brit Awards: Best British Group, and Best British Album (for The Raw & the Cooked). Their name came from the 1960 film All the Fine Young Cannibals starring Robert Wagner and Natalie Wood.

History 
The group was formed in 1984 after the dissolution of The Beat, with whom Cox and Steele previously played. The duo of Steele and Cox spent eight months listening to over 500 cassettes of potential singers before picking Gift. They had difficulty obtaining a record contract, but when a video of their song "Johnny Come Home" appeared on British TV show The Tube, recording contract offers flowed in immediately. The band's eponymous debut album was released in 1985, spawning two UK hit singles, "Johnny Come Home" and a cover of Mark James' "Suspicious Minds" featuring additional vocals by Jimmy Somerville. The two songs also became hits internationally, charting in the top 40 in Europe, Canada, and Australia although they failed to make a significant impact on the US charts.

Fine Young Cannibals appeared as the house band in a nightclub in the 1987 comedy film Tin Men and also contributed songs to the film's soundtrack.

In the gap between their first and second albums, Steele and Cox released an instrumental house single under the moniker "Two Men, a Drum Machine and a Trumpet" in 1987, called "Tired of Getting Pushed Around", which reached No. 18 in the UK Singles Chart and was popular on the U.S. dance chart. During this time, Gift appeared in the movie Sammy and Rosie Get Laid.

The band continued their international success with the singles "She Drives Me Crazy" and "Good Thing", from the 1989 album The Raw & the Cooked. Both songs reached #1 in the US, while She Drives Me Crazy topped the Australian Chart for 3 non-consecutive weeks. The latter song was their second #1 on the Billboard Hot 100 on 8 July 1989. It also peaked at #7 on the UK Singles Chart and in Australia.  The Raw & the Cooked included three songs the band had recorded for Tin Men (including "Good Thing"), and their cover of the Buzzcocks' "Ever Fallen in Love (With Someone You Shouldn't've)" recorded for the film Something Wild.

In 1990, the band contributed a cover version of Cole Porter's song "Love for Sale" for the album Red Hot + Blue which was produced by the Red Hot Organization. The album is a collection of 20 Cole Porter songs recorded by various artists as a benefit for AIDS research.

Fine Young Cannibals disbanded in 1992, although they briefly returned to the studio in 1996 to record a new single, "The Flame", which complemented The Finest, their greatest hits compilation which was released in the same year.

Band members
Andy Cox – guitars, keyboards, organ
Roland Gift – vocals
David Steele – bass, keyboards, synthesizers, piano, drum machine

Session and touring members

Martin Parry – drums, percussion
Graeme Hamilton – trumpet, piano

Awards and nominations
{| class=wikitable
|-
! Year !! Awards !! Work !! Category !! Result !! Ref. 
|-
| rowspan=4|1989
| rowspan=4|MTV Video Music Awards
| rowspan=4|"She Drives Me Crazy"
| Video of the Year
| 
|rowspan=4|
|-
| Best Group Video
| 
|-
| Breakthrough Video
| 
|-
| Viewer's Choice
| 
|-
| rowspan=12|1990
| rowspan=2|Brit Awards
| Themselves
| British Group
| 
| rowspan=2|
|-
| The Raw & the Cooked
| British Album of the Year
| 
|-
| rowspan=3|Grammy Awards
| rowspan=2|"She Drives Me Crazy"
| Record of the Year
| 
| rowspan=3|
|-
| Best Pop Performance by a Duo or Group with Vocals
| 
|-
| rowspan=2|The Raw & the Cooked
| Album of the Year
| 
|-
| rowspan=2|Juno Awards
| International Album of the Year
| 
| rowspan=2|
|-
| rowspan=3|"She Drives Me Crazy"
| International Single of the Year
| 
|-
| rowspan=2|Ivor Novello Awards
| Best Contemporary Song
| 
|rowspan=2|
|-
| International Hit of the Year
| 
|-
| Pollstar Concert Industry Awards
| Tour
| Best Debut Tour
| 
|
|-
| rowspan=3|ASCAP Pop Music Awards
| "Good Thing"
| rowspan=3|Most Performed Songs
| 
| rowspan=2|
|-
| rowspan=2|"She Drives Me Crazy"
| 
|-
| 1991
| 
|

Discography

Studio albums

Compilation albums

Remix albums

Singles

See also
List of number-one hits (United States)
List of artists who reached number one on the Hot 100 (United States)
List of number-one dance hits (United States)
List of artists who reached number one on the U.S. Dance chart

References

External links

 

Brit Award winners
London Records artists
I.R.S. Records artists
British musical trios
Musical groups established in 1984
Musical groups disestablished in 1992
Musical groups reestablished in 1996
Musical groups disestablished in 1996
Musical groups reestablished in 2017
Musical groups disestablished in 2017
Musical groups from Birmingham, West Midlands
English pop rock music groups
English ska musical groups
Sophisti-pop musical groups
British soul musical groups